Cochylimorpha armeniana is a species of moth of the family Tortricidae. It is found in Asia Minor (Kayseri), Afghanistan (Pamir) and Iran.

References

 

A
Moths of Asia
Moths of the Middle East
Fauna of Armenia
Insects of Iran
Moths described in 1891